2WEI or 2WEI Music (from German "Zwei": "Two", the -ei being pronounced like the English letter i) is a composer team founded by Christian Vorländer and Simon Heeger in early 2016. The group is based in Hamburg, Germany. Their music has been featured in numerous movie trailers including Wonder Woman and Darkest Hour.

Background 
Christian Vorländer and Simon Heeger have known each other since college, after which they pursued different career paths. Vorländer began working for Hans Zimmer and Junkie XL in Los Angeles, while Heeger worked at advertising music houses like Mophonics and Yessian.

Vorländer returned to Germany in 2015, and in 2016 they joined forces and formed 2WEI, combining their skills from the advertising and film score music world.

Since then, the group has had a continuous success, licensing their tracks for various promotional campaigns. Most recently their tracks have been used in a series of animations created by YouTube user SAD-ist, based on events in the Dream SMP, a Minecraft server dedicated to improvisational role-playing. The popularity of these animations resulted in the group providing SAD-ist with an unreleased track to use specifically for her animation, as well as providing the sound design.

The composer duo has had their tracks promoted to various trailer houses and music editors by Position Music, the label which they are currently working with. Soon after, their music was chosen to be featured in various major Hollywood movie trailers.

Licensing credits

Movie trailers 
Major movie trailers include: Wonder Woman, Tomb Raider, Ghost in the Shell, War for the Planet of the Apes, Valerian and the City of a Thousand Planets, Darkest Hour, Mortal Engines, and Hellboy.

Game trailers 
2WEI has composed and remixed music for trailers of League of Legends, Call of Duty, Battlefield, Need for Speed, Valorant, Assassin's Creed Valhalla, Apex Legends, Tiny Tina's Wonderlands, Onmyoji, Garena Free Fire, War Thunder and many more.
On the 9th of January 2020, 2WEI presented, as an association with Edda Hayes and Blur Studio, a version of the song Warriors by Imagine Dragons, for it to be the soundtrack of the music video to promote the season of 2020 of the videogame League of Legends (Riot Games).

Advertising 

2WEI's music has been featured in ads for Lufthansa, Audi, Mercedes, FILA, Samsung, Facebook, BMW, Calgary Flames, and more.
In 2018 they were awarded with the Golden Lion in Cannes for the best composition.

Discography 
2017: 2WEI  — "Escape Velocity"
2018: 2WEI  — "Sequels"
2019: Dimitri Vegas & Like Mike, Bassjackers and 2WEI — "Mortal Kombat (Anthem)"
2020: League of Legends, 2WEI and Edda Hayes — "Warriors"
2020: 2WEI feat. Ali Christenhusz — "Emergence"
2021: 2WEI, Edda Hayes — "Pandora"
2021: 2WEI, Edda Hayes — "Burn"
2021: 2WEI — "Kill The Crown"
2021: 2WEI,Schepetkov — "Shape of My Heart"
2021: 2WEI and Edda Hayes — "Blindside"
2021: 2WEI, Edda Hayes and Ali Christenhusz — "What a Wonderful World"
2021: VALORANT, 2WEI feat. Ali Christenhusz — "KAY/O"
2022: 2WEI, Tommee Profitt, Fleurie — "Mad World"
2022: League of Legends, 2WEI and Edda Hayes — "The Call"
2022: 2WEI, Schepetkov — "Taina"

See also 
 Trailer music
 Film score
 Music in advertising

References 

2016 establishments in Germany
German film score composers
Musical groups established in 2016
Musical groups from Hamburg